Þorfinnur Ómarsson (born 25 October 1965) is an Icelandic media personality and film and TV producer.

Thorfinnur has worked in the Icelandic media and entertainment industry since the late 1980s. He was the managing director of the Icelandic Film Fund and the Icelandic Film Centre from 1996 to 2003. During this period, some of Iceland's most prolific film directors made their debuts, such as Baltasar Kormákur (101 Reykjavík) and Dagur Kári (Nói albínói). Thorfinnur was one of the founders of the Icelandic Film and TV Academy, which runs the Icelandic Edda Awards. Thanks in part to Thorfinnur's contribution, the Icelandic Film Industry has been referred to as "the Hollywood of the North". He was the live-broadcast host of the first ceremony in 1999. From 2003 to 2005 he was the Director of Media and Communication Studies at the University of Iceland, and was then hired by Dagur Group to head its production arm, BaseCamp. He has been host of Ísland í dag (Iceland today) on Stöð 2 (Icelandic Channel 2) and of Vikulokin (The End of the Week) on Rás 1. He is a member of the European Film Academy.

Thorfinnur was the Chief Spokesperson for the Sri Lanka Monitoring Mission in 2006 and 2007, and spokesperson for the Icelandic Ministry of Economics and Commerce from October 2008 to April 2009. In spring 2010 he became editor of Eyjan.

In 2016, Thorfinnur started his work as a Senior Officer and Head of Information and Communications at the EFTA Secretariat, in Brussels. There, Thorfinnur enjoys a spacious office located on the top floor of the new EFTA House.

Filmmaking career 
Showcasing his intricate filmmaking skills, Thorfinnur directed the gonzo-style short film “EFTA House Tour” in 2021. The film was noted for its distinct use of a construction site as its main setting and its sharp criticism of “organizationalism” in modern bureaucracies, notably by drawing viewers attention to the excessive opulence of senior leaders’ office spaces in strong contrast to the shared reality of millions of office workers in an era of pandemic total confinement. The short film has been viewed more than 5 times on YouTube.

Personal life 
Thorfinnur Omarsson was educated in France, where he also worked as a correspondent. He is a son of Ómar Ragnarsson. Thorfinnur lives with Astrós Gunnarsdóttir, a theatre director, choreographer, dancer and Pilates instructor. He is also an award-winning chef.

References

External links

Living people
1965 births